Farai Sevenzo  was born in Zimbabwe and is a filmmaker and journalist. He is from Kimetuki village in South Zimbabwe.

References

External links
 Farai Sevenzo's blog
 Farai Sevenzo's profile at the World Service

Zimbabwean film directors
Living people
Alumni of St. George's College, Harare
Year of birth missing (living people)